Yarr Radio was a British music radio station aimed at a young Asian audience, which broadcast from 2003 until 2008 on digital radio in various regions of the United Kingdom, and on Sky Channel 187.

Launched in 2003 by Indo-Canadian singer Jazzy B, it was called 'London's First Young Asian Hit Music Station'. The original presenters of 'Yaar Radio' were: Maya, Ranj Rekhi, Sonia Paneser, Danny Deol, Dee Singh, Kim Boss, Vinny Virdee (aka: Jas Rao or Jas 'The Man'), Ellia Khan (aka: Noreen Khan).  The management had a policy of playing only Asian music, consisting of "the latest Bhangra and Bollywood mixes" and "the hottest urban, fusion and R&B".

Part of the Sunrise Radio Group, it was based at Sunrise's headquarters in Southall, west London. On some frequencies it was replaced by Sunrise's Punjabi Radio.

References

External links
 Yarr Radio (official site)

Digital-only radio stations
Asian mass media in the United Kingdom
British Indian mass media
Defunct radio stations in the United Kingdom